Bjarne Hurlen (13 October 1915 – 19 November 1998) was a Norwegian military officer, engineer and industrialist.

He was born in Ålesund to Johan B. Hurlen and Emma Hildre. In 1943 he married Oline Oseasen Midthassel.

Hurlen served as chief executive of Kongsberg Våpenfabrikk from 1956 to 1975, and from 1962 to 1972 also chief executive of Raufoss Ammunisjonsfabrikker. He was decorated Knight, First Class of the Order of St. Olav in 1964, and was a Knight of the Swedish Order of Vasa.

References

1915 births
1998 deaths
People from Ålesund
Norwegian Army personnel of World War II
20th-century Norwegian engineers
20th-century Norwegian businesspeople
Norwegian Military Academy alumni
Norwegian Institute of Technology alumni
Knights of the Order of Vasa